Charles Egbu  is an academic from Nigeria in the field of construction management, who  has worked in higher education in the United Kingdom for over 25 years. He is the vice chancellor of Leeds Trinity University, United Kingdom, becoming the first black person in such a role in any UK university.

Early life and education
Egbu comes from Abatete, in the Idemili North Local Government Area, Anambra State of Nigeria.

He obtained his first degree in quantity surveying at Leeds Metropolitan University with first class honours. His doctorate in construction project management was obtained from the University of Salford. He obtained an advanced diploma in research award supervision from Leeds Metropolitan University Leeds, UK.

Career

Egbu was the pro-vice-chancellor at the University of East London and Dean of the school of Built Environment and Architecture at London South Bank University. He was previously at the University of Salford, Glasgow Caledonian University and University College London.

He was director, trustee and chairman of the professional standards and knowledge committee of the Association for Project Management (APM).  In May 2017 he was admitted to the Worshipful Company of Constructors and earned the Freedom of the City of London. He was the president of the Chartered Institute of Building CIOB for 2019-2020. He was a governor, and member of the London Design and Engineering UTC.

He became vice-chancellor of Leeds Trinity University in November 2020.

Research 
He has lectured nationally and internationally in areas of sustainable development, construction economics, resilient Communities, knowledge management in complex environment, construction project management, and contract procurement. He has attracted more than £25M of research and enterprise income from numerous research funding bodies, and published 12 books and over 300 published academic works in journals, and conferences proceedings.

Personal life
He is married with children.

References

Year of birth missing (living people)
Living people
Academics of the University of East London
Academics of London South Bank University
Academics of the University of Salford
Academics of University College London
People from Anambra State
Academics of Glasgow Caledonian University
Academics of Leeds Beckett University
Alumni of the University of Salford
Alumni of Leeds Beckett University
People associated with Leeds Trinity University